Sant'Erasmo may refer to:

 Sant'Erasmo, an island in the Venetian Lagoon lying north-east of the Lido island and east of Venice, Italy.
 Sant'Erasmo, Bassiano, a Roman Catholic church located in Bassiano, province of Latina, region of Lazio, central Italy.
 Sant'Erasmo, Veroli, a Romanesque architecture, Roman Catholic church and convent located in Veroli, province of Frosinone, region of Lazio, central Italy.

See also 

 Saint Erasmus
 Erasmo